Prahova County is a county (județ) of Romania, in the historical region Muntenia, with the capital city at Ploiești.

Demographics 

In 2011, it had a population of 762,886 and the population density was 161/km². It is Romania's third most populated county (after the Municipality of Bucharest and Iași County), having a population density double that of the country's mean.

 Romanians - 97.74%
 Romas and others - 2.26%

The county received an inflow of population who have moved here due to the industrial development.

Geography
This county has a total area of 4,716 km².

The relief is split in approximately equal parts between the mountains, the hills and the plain. In the North side there are mountains from the southern end of the Eastern Carpathians - the Curvature Carpathians group; and the Bucegi Mountains the Eastern end of the Southern Carpathians group. The two groups are separated by the Prahova River Valley.

The south side of the county is a plain, on the North West side of the Romanian Plain.

The main river is the eponymous Prahova River. It flows from the mountains, through the Prahova Valley collecting many other rivers - the Doftana River, the Teleajen River and others.

Neighbours

Buzău County in the East.
Dâmbovița County in the West.
Brașov County in the North.
Ialomița County and Ilfov County in the South.

Economy
The area contains the main oil reserves in Romania, with a longstanding tradition in extracting and refining the oil. The county is heavily industrialised, more than 115,000 people being involved in industrial activities. It contributes to over 8% of the country's industrial production. Some of the biggest international corporations like Coca-Cola, Unilever, InBev, Johnson Controls, Cameron, Weatherford, Michelin, Timken and others have invested heavily in the recent years.

The predominant industries in the county are:
 Oil industry - almost 50% of the county's industrial production.
 Oil extracting equipment.
 Chemical industry.
 Rubber industry.
 Mechanical components industry.
 Food and beverages industry.
 Textile industry.

Agriculture is also developed - in the southern part mainly extensive agriculture and the hills area is well suited for wines and fruit orchards. In total it realises about 3% of the country's agricultural production.

Tourism
The Prahova Valley is one of the areas with the highest tourist potential in the country having one of the best tourism facilities in Romania.

The main tourist destinations are:
 On the Prahova Valley:
 The Sinaia Resort.
 The Bușteni Resort.
 The Azuga Resort.
 The Bucegi Mountains.
 On the Teleajen River Valley:
 The Vălenii de Munte Resort.
 Cheia.
 Slănic.
 The Zăganul Mountains
 The Ciucaș Mountains.
 On the Doftana River Valley:
 The Telega Resort.
 Valea Doftanei.
 The Gârbova Mountains.
 The city of Ploiești.
 The city of Câmpina.

Politics 

The Prahova County Council, renewed at the 2020 local elections, consists of 36 counsellors, with the following party composition:

Administrative divisions
Prahova County has 2 municipalities, 12 towns and 90 communes

Municipalities
Câmpina - population: 32,935 (as of 2011)
Ploiești - capital city; population: 209,945 (as of 2011)

Towns

Azuga
Băicoi
Boldești-Scăeni
Breaza
Bușteni
Comarnic
Mizil
Plopeni
Sinaia
Slǎnic
Urlaţi
Vălenii de Munte

Communes

Adunați
Albești-Paleologu
Aluniș
Apostolache
Ariceștii Rahtivani
Ariceștii Zeletin
Baba Ana
Balta Doamnei
Bălțești
Bănești
Bărcănești
Bătrâni
Berceni
Bertea
Blejoi
Boldești-Grădiștea
Brazi
Brebu
Bucov
Călugăreni
Cărbunești
Ceptura
Cerașu
Chiojdeanca
Ciorani
Cocorăștii Mislii
Cocorăștii Colț
Colceag
Cornu
Cosminele
Drăgănești
Drajna
Dumbrava
Dumbrăvești
Filipeștii de Pădure
Filipeștii de Târg
Fântânele
Florești
Fulga
Gherghița
Gorgota
Gornet
Gornet-Cricov
Gura Vadului
Gura Vitioarei
Iordăcheanu
Izvoarele
Jugureni
Lapoș
Lipănești
Măgurele
Măgureni
Măneciu
Mănești
Olari
Păcureți
Păulești
Plopu
Podenii Noi
Poiana Câmpina
Poienarii Burchii
Posești
Predeal-Sărari
Provița de Jos
Provița de Sus
Puchenii Mari
Râfov
Salcia
Sălciile
Scorțeni
Secăria
Sângeru
Șirna
Șoimari
Șotrile
Starchiojd
Ștefești
Surani
Talea
Tătaru
Teișani
Telega
Tinosu
Târgșoru Vechi
Tomșani
Vadu Săpat
Valea Călugărească
Valea Doftanei
Vărbilău
Vâlcănești

Historical county

Historically, the county was located in the south central part of Greater Romania, in the central part of the historical region of Muntenia. Its capital was Ploiești (then spelt Ploești). The interwar county territory comprised a large part of the current Prahova County, except the town of Mizil and several nearby villages that were then in Buzău County. In addition to the current county's territory, the interwar county contained several communes in its western part (including Dărmănești, I.L. Caragiale, and Moreni), currently in Dâmbovița County, and some territory northwest of Predeal, now in Brașov County.

Administration

The county was originally divided into seven administrative districts (plăși):

Plasa Câmpina, headquartered at Câmpina
Plasa Drăgănești, headquartered at Drăgănești
Plasa Filipești, headquartered at Filipești
Plasa Ploiești, headquartered at Ploești
Plasa Sinaia, headquartered at Sinaia
Plasa Urlați, headquartered at Urlați
Plasa Văleni, headquartered at Văleni

Subsequently, the county established three more districts:Plasa Câmpu, headquartered at Câmpu
Plasa Podgoria, headquartered at Podgoria
Plasa Vărbilău, headquartered at Vărbilău

Population 
According to the 1930 census data, the county population was 477,750 inhabitants, ethnically divided as follows: 95.0% Romanians, 1.5% Gypsies, 0.9% Jews, 0.8% Hungarians, 0.7% Germans, as well as other minorities. From the religious point of view, the population was 96.0% Eastern Orthodox, 1.2% Roman Catholic, 1.0% Jewish, 0.6% Lutherans, 0.5% Greek Catholic, as well as other minorities.

Urban population 
In 1930, the county's urban population was 105,098 inhabitants, comprising 88.8% Romanians, 3.5% Jews, 1.9% Hungarians, 1.7% Germans, 1.4% Romanies, as well as other minorities. From the religious point of view, the urban population was composed of 89.2% Eastern Orthodox, 3.6% Jewish, 3.3% Roman Catholic, 1.5% Lutheran, 1.3% Greek Catholic, 0.6% Reformed, as well as other minorities.

See also
Prahova River
Prahova Valley

References

External links

 
Counties of Romania
Geography of Wallachia
1879 establishments in Romania
1938 disestablishments in Romania
1940 establishments in Romania
1950 disestablishments in Romania
1968 establishments in Romania
States and territories established in 1879
States and territories disestablished in 1938
States and territories established in 1940
States and territories disestablished in 1950
States and territories established in 1968